Emma Mills (born March 20, 1989) is an American author of young adult romance novels, scientist, and YouTuber.

Biography
Mills first started writing her debut novel First & Then in high school. She completed the book in college. She has a Ph.D. in Anatomy and Cell Biology from Indiana University.

She started the YouTube channel "How To Adult" with fellow YA author T. Michael Martin. In 2017, they sold the channel to John and Hank Green's online video company, Complexly.

Personal life
Mills lives in St. Louis, Missouri. Mills vlogs on her YouTube channel, Elmify.

Works 
It took her two years to sell her first published novel, First & Then. She has stated that This Adventure Ends was partially inspired by The Mixed Up Files of Mrs. Basil E. Frankweiler by E.L. Konigsburg.

First & Then and Lucky Caller received starred reviews from Kirkus Reviews. Lucky Caller and Foolish Hearts received starred reviews from Publishers Weekly.

Kirkus wrote in the review of Lucky Caller: "Mills [...] truly excels at creating vivid characters that will tear at readers’ heartstrings." Publishers Weekly wrote that Mills "delivers a well-crafted, bittersweet comedy of errors filled with realistically flawed characters and taut, witty dialogue."

Books
 Lucky Caller. Henry Holt, 2020.
 Famous in a Small Town. Henry Holt, 2019.
Foolish Hearts. Henry Holt, 2017.
This Adventure Ends. Henry Holt, 2016.
 First & Then. Henry Holt, 2015.

References

External links 
Official website
Q&A with Publishers Weekly

American young adult novelists
American women novelists
Living people
1989 births
People from St. Louis
American YouTubers
21st-century American women